1in.am Armenian News and Analyses ( Arajin Lratvakan, meaning "First informative"), or simply 1in.am is an Armenian website with hosting based in New York.

About
1in.am is an online newspaper, that covers local and world news and information. It has divisions for Armenia, Caucasus, world, press, business and sports (last two in Armenian only) related news. 1in.am is available in three languages, Armenian, Russian and English.  it is the 19th most visited website in Armenia and has about 38,000 visitors daily.

See also

 Mass media in Armenia

References

External links
 1in.am English version
 Facebook page

Armenian news websites